Bill Pittuck (born 13 July 1963) is a British strongman competitor, notable for having won both major British titles and having been a repeat competitor at the World's Strongest Man, as well as achieving a high standing in the World Muscle Power Classic.

Biography 
Bill Pittuck rose to prominence in the early 1990s. His first experience of World's Strongest Man was as a coach when at the 1990 World's Strongest Man, alongside Geoff Capes he trained Adrian Smith. He promised at that event that one day he would come back in his own right and between then and 1995 he trained and competed prolifically. Bill went on to win England's Strongest Man in 1991, two British Muscle Power titles, the title of UK's Strongest Man and was also crowned Britain's Strongest Man in 1994. Combined with consistently strong performances against the best in Europe in the European Muscle Power Classic tournament and against the best in the world at the World Muscle Power Classic championships where he finished fourth in 1993 and fifth in 1994 meant that he was eventually invited to the 1995 World's Strongest Man contest. In that same year he was placed third in the World Muscle Power, underlying his international reputation. In 1996 he again qualified for the 1996 World's Strongest Man and placed fourth at the World Muscle Power Classic. He competed little in 1997 and 1998, but returned in to compete once more at 1999 World's Strongest Man, and once again was third in the World Muscle Power Classic. In 2001 and 2002, Bill won England's Strongest Man, and came second to the internationally renowned world champion bodybuilder and strongman, Eddy Ellwood, in 2003.

References

1963 births
British strength athletes
Living people